Norway was represented by Anita Skorgan, with the song "Casanova", at the 1977 Eurovision Song Contest, which took place on 7 May in London. "Casanova" was chosen as the Norwegian entry at the Melodi Grand Prix on 28 February. This was the first of three Eurovision appearances (and a further uncredited fourth) for Skorgan.

Before Eurovision

Melodi Grand Prix 1977 
The Melodi Grand Prix 1977 was held at the studios of broadcaster NRK in Oslo, hosted by Vidar Lønn-Arnesen. The Orchestra was conducted by Carsten Klouman.

Six songs took part in the final, with the winner chosen by voting from six regional juries.
Other participants included former Norwegian representatives Kirsti Sparboe (1965, 1967 and 1969), Odd Børre (1968) and Benny Borg (1972).

At Eurovision 
On the night of the final Skorgan performed 5th in the running order, following Austria and preceding Germany. Like the previous year's Norwegian entry "Mata Hari", "Casanova" was an uptempo song with a disco-style arrangement, but for a second year the national juries showed that this was not the type of song they were looking for. At the close of voting "Casanova" had picked up only 18 points, placing Norway joint 14th (with Portugal) of the 18 entries. The Norwegian jury awarded its 12 points to Ireland.

Postcards controversy
On the night of the broadcast, many viewers wondered why they were merely shown panning shots over the audience in between the songs, rather than the postcard-style clips of the next performers which had become traditional in the 1970s. It later transpired that the planned postcards had been filmed by the BBC during a night out for all the performers at a London nightclub, but when they were previewed NRK had objected as in several of the clips Skorgan could be seen drinking alcohol – at 18 years old she was below the age for legal alcohol consumption in Norway (although not in the United Kingdom) – and behaving in a manner which NRK deemed inappropriate. The Swedish delegation also complained that their performers had been caught on film conducting themselves in a less than exemplary way. As there was insufficient time or opportunity left to film a different set of postcards for all the participating countries, the BBC was left with no option but to scrap them completely.

Voting

References

External links 
Full national final on nrk.no

1977
Countries in the Eurovision Song Contest 1977
1977
Eurovision
Eurovision